The 2022 season was the Welsh Fire's second season of the 100 ball franchise cricket, The Hundred. The franchise struggled during the competition, with both the men's and women's teams finishing bottom of their groups.

Players

Men's side 
 Bold denotes players with international caps.

Women's side 
 Bold denotes players with international caps.

Regular season

Fixtures (Men)

Fixtures (Women)
Due to the shortened women's competition, Trent Rockets didn't play against Oval Invincibles.
.

Standings

Women

 advances to Final
 advances to the Eliminator

Men

 advances to Final
 advances to the Eliminator

References

The Hundred (cricket)
2022 in English cricket